Silks and Satins is a 1916 American silent film produced by the Famous Players Film Company and distributed  by Paramount Pictures. It starred Marguerite Clark and was directed by J. Searle Dawley.

It was filmed at Palisades, New Jersey. A preserved film is at the British Film Institute, London.

Cast
Marguerite Clark as Felicite
Vernon Steele as Jacques Desmond
Clarence Handyside as Marquis
William A. Williams as Henri (credited as W.A. Williams)
Thomas Holding as Felix Breton
Fayette Perry as Annette

References

External links

AllMovie.com

1916 films
American silent feature films
Films directed by J. Searle Dawley
1910s romance films
American black-and-white films
American romance films
1910s American films